Mississippi Highway 43 (MS 43) is a state highway in Mississippi that generally runs north–south in three segments: the first from US 90 near Bay St. Louis to MS 13 south of Columbia, resuming at MS 13 in southern Jefferson Davis County to end near Mendenhall, and finally starting again at MS 18 near Puckett to end at Attala Road 3122 in northern Attala County.

Route Description

Southern segment

MS 43, concurrent with MS 603, begins in Hancock County just west of Bay St. Louis in Waveland at an intersection with US 90. The highway heads north through a business district as a four-lane undivided boulevard before widening to a divided highway as it leaves Waveland and curves to the northwest. MS 43/MS 603 pass through the suburban community of Shoreline Park for the next several miles to cross Bayou La Croix and have an interchange with I-10 at Exit 13. The heads northward through rural terrain for the next few miles, where it narrows to two-lanes and has an intersection with the access road for Stennis International Airport, which also houses many of the county's services. MS 43/MS 603 meet Texas Flat Road before crossing the Jourdan River and passing through the town of Kiln, where MS 43 splits from MS 603. MS 43 passes northwestward through rural areas (and the community of Wiehe) for several miles, crossing the Jourdan River for a second time, before entering Pearl River County.

MS 43 heads west through farmland to enter the city of Picayune, where it passes through neighborhoods before widening to a four-lane divided highway and coming to an interchange with I-59 (Exit 4), with MS 43 following I-59 north to Exit 6, where it crosses Hobolochitto Creek. MS 43 heads west from Exit 6 as a four-lane divided highway through a mix of neighborhoods and businesses to have an intersection with US 11. The highway narrows to two-lanes as it leaves Picayune, crossing Hobolochitto Creek again before having an intersection with MS 43 Spur (MS 992/Beech Street). MS 43 winds its way northwest through farmland and wooded areas for several miles, passing through the Cybur community, before turning northward and coming to an intersection with MS 26 at the Crossroads community.

The highway now parallels the Pearl River as it winds its way north through wooded areas for several miles to cross into Marion County, coming to an end shortly thereafter at an intersection with MS 13 between Columbia and Lumberton.

Middle segment

MS 43 begins in Jefferson Davis County at an intersection with MS 13 just north of Society Hill and heads west as a two-lane highway through woodlands to pass through Oak Vale, where it crosses into Lawrence County.

MS 43 turns northwest through farmland, passing through Arm, before crossing the Silver Creek and having an intersection with MS 43A. The highway continues northwest to have a short concurrency with MS 184, just across the Pearl River from Monticello, before joining US 84 east for a few miles. US 84/MS 43 enter the Silver Creek city limits at another intersection with MS 184 before MS 43 splits off at an intersection with MS 43A, winding its way through town along Front Street, where it has its final intersection with MS 184 (Southern Avenue). MS 43 leaves Silver Creek and heads northeast to enter New Hebron, where it passes through town along Jones Street, Main Avenue, and Franklin Street, having intersections with both MS 915 (unsigned/Jones Street) and MS 42 (Indiana Avenue). The highway heads north to leave New Hebron and straddle the line with Jefferson Davis County before crossing into Simpson County.

MS 43 heads northeast through a mix of woods and farmland as it has an intersection with MS 478 and passes through Shivers. It then comes to an intersection with MS 28, which it briefly follows westward as it has an intersection with MS 472 and passes through Pinola. The highway winds it way northeast as it parallels the Strong River for several miles before entering Mendenhall and immediately coming to an end at another intersection with MS 13 just west of downtown.

Northern segment

MS 43 begins in Rankin County in Puckett at an intersection with MS 18 just northwest of downtown. It winds its way northward as a two-lane highway through farmland for several miles to have an interchange with I-20 (Exit 68) before passing through Pelahatchie, where it has an intersection with US 80. The highway winds its way northwest to have an intersection with MS 481 before passing through Sand Hill, Koch (where it has an interchange with MS 25), and Goshen Springs (where it has an intersection with MS 471) before crossing a Causeway over the Ross Barnett Reservoir (part of the Pearl River) into Madison County.

MS 43 immediately has an interchange with the Natchez Trace Parkway at Madisonville before passing northward through Canton, bypassing downtown along its eastern side while having a short concurrency with MS 16. The highway now turns northeast through mostly wooded areas for the next several miles, where it passes through Sharon, before crossing into Leake County.

MS 43 begins paralleling the Natchez Trace as it passes through the community of Thomastown, where it has a junction with MS 429, before continuing northeast for several more miles before crossing into Attala County.

MS 43 becomes concurrent with MS 14 for a couple of miles to enter the Kosciusko outskirts, where it follows a beltway around downtown while having an intersection with MS 735 and concurrencies with MS 12, MS 19, and MS 35. The highway heads north out of Kosciusko through remote terrain for several miles to the Montgomery County line, where MS 43 comes to an end at an intersection with Winfry Road.

Major intersections

Related routes

Highway 43 Spur

MS 43 Spur, officially inventoried as Mississippi Highway 992 (MS 992), is a short local road which runs through Picayune, Mississippi. Its northern terminus is at MS 43 and its southern terminus is just north of Goodyear Boulevard in Picayune. In accordance with its MS 992 designation, MS 43 Spur is the highest numbered state highway in the entire state of Mississippi.

Highway 43A

Mississippi Highway 43A (MS 43A) is an unsigned  alternate route of MS 43 in Lawrence County, Mississippi.

MS 43A begins at an intersection with MS 43 just northwest of the community of Arm. It heads north through rural areas, running parallel to the Silver Creek, for several miles to enter the town of Silver Creek and come to an end at an intersection with MS 184/MS 43. The entire route of MS 43A is a two-lane highway.  The route is not legally defined in Mississippi Code § 65-3-3, and is a county road and city street not maintained by MDOT.  A single MS 43A shield sign exists at the northern terminus at MS 184 in Silver Creek.

Major intersections

References

External links

043
Transportation in Hancock County, Mississippi
Transportation in Pearl River County, Mississippi
Transportation in Marion County, Mississippi
Transportation in Jefferson Davis County, Mississippi
Transportation in Lawrence County, Mississippi
Transportation in Simpson County, Mississippi
Transportation in Rankin County, Mississippi
Transportation in Madison County, Mississippi
Transportation in Leake County, Mississippi
Transportation in Attala County, Mississippi